Richard Mayer may refer to:

 Richard Mayer (rower) (1892–?), Austrian Olympic rower
 Richard E. Mayer (born 1947), American educational psychologist
 Richard J. Mayer (born 1952), American engineer
 Dick Mayer (1924–1989), American golfer

See also
 Richard Meyer (disambiguation)